Brian Thomas Wood (8 December 1940 – 5 July 2014) was an English footballer who played as a central defender.

Career
Born in Hamworthy, Wood made a total of 476 appearances in The Football League for West Bromwich Albion, Crystal Palace, Leyton Orient, Colchester United and Workington. After leaving Workington, he became a scout for Preston North End, a job he combined with managing the Willis Faber and Dumas sports club in Ipswich.

After suffering dementia and Parkinson's disease, Wood died in a care home in Saxtead, Suffolk on 5 July 2014.

Honours

Club
Crystal Palace
 Football League Third Division Runner-up (1): 1963–64

References

External links
 
 

1940 births
2014 deaths
English footballers
English Football League players
Association football defenders
West Bromwich Albion F.C. players
Crystal Palace F.C. players
Leyton Orient F.C. players
Colchester United F.C. players
Workington A.F.C. players